The Embassy Theatre is a historic structure on Broadway in the city of Peterborough in the United Kingdom, which operated as a cinema from 1953 to 1989.

History
The Embassy Theatre was designed by David Evelyn Nye in the Art Deco style and built by The Demolition & Construction Co. of Croydon using the locally produced Fletton bricks. It opened in 1937, putting on performances by well-known performers such as Laurel and Hardy.

Nye was usually a cinema architect, and this was his only theatre. However, the building was converted into a cinema in 1953, later becoming the ABC and finally Cannon Cinema. It tripled in size in 1981, before finally closing in 1989. Since 1996, part of the premises have been occupied by the Edwards bar chain.

References

Art Deco architecture in England
Buildings and structures in Peterborough
Theatres completed in 1937
1937 establishments in the United Kingdom